TESSA is an acronym, it may refer to:

 Tax-exempt special savings account, a tax-privileged investment wrapper in the United Kingdom which was replaced by the ISA
 the Los Angeles Public Library online historical collections

See also
 Tessa (disambiguation)